Luperón is a town in the Puerto Plata province of the Dominican Republic. It lies in a coastal bay in the north of the country and is a small tourist center. The town is named after the Dominican president, Gregorio Luperón, who is depicted on the city's seal.

The town was formerly known as Blanco (White) or Pueblo Blanco (White Town), possibly after the many Spaniards who came to trade timber. Due to its shape and location, Bahía de Luperón (Luperón Bay) is ideal for sheltering from hurricanes, and a large number of ships anchor there during the hurricane season.

Although there is no record of early inhabitants, it is said that Christopher Columbus had to enter the bay to protect his ships from a storm. Columbus named it "Bahia de Gracias" (Thanksgiving Bay), the current official name.

The current mayor is Douglas Pichardo of the Modern Revolutionary Party (PRM in Spanish) who is the youngest mayor in town history.

Dictator Rafael Leonidas Trujillo intended to elevate Luperón to the status of a province, but he was assassinated in May 1961, a few months before the scheduled change.

Three of the better-known families are the Morrobel, Cueto, and Villamán families. They were the town's pioneers. Their numbers continue to grow. Luperón is known for its beaches, which make it a prime vacation destination. In recent years, a sizeable population of Luperónians have moved abroad (most notably to Spain), often retaining their careers in the resort and catering industries.

The bay contains extensive mangroves, unique to Hispaniola, which provide habitat for many species.

Cockfights take place every Friday afternoon in Luperón's arena. Money is made from bets and from the entrance fee. The sport is legal in the Dominican Republic and it is followed by thousands in the country. However, compared to most towns in Cibao (the island's north), cockfighting is less popular here.

Every year, the town holds a heavily attended softball tournament. The games take place every Saturday and Sunday, at the local field. Games are played only during the daytime, as the field lacks electric lights. The Williams family is noted for baseball expertise in Luperón.

Basketball is also popular, with a basketball tournament being held every summer. The tournament rules permit up to two non-Luperón-born players per team, and a few players come from other municipalities. Unlike softball, the basketball games are played at night, also during the weekends.  Attendees are charged a small fee to enter.

Climate 
Luperón has a tropical savanna climate with a pronounced dry season in summer and a wet season in winter (Köppen climate classification: As).

References

Sources 
 – World-Gazetteer.com

Populated places in Puerto Plata Province
Municipalities of the Dominican Republic